The 1973 World Rally Championship was the inaugural season for the Fédération Internationale de l'Automobile (FIA) World Rally Championship (WRC) format. It consisted of 13 events, each held in a different country of the world. Many of the events would be staples of the series through to today, including Monte Carlo, Sweden, Tour de Corse, and the RAC Rally, while others would soon be replaced in the schedule. As with following seasons, gravel events formed the majority of the schedule. Two pure tarmac and one snow and ice rally were also included, as well as three events held on a mixture of soft and hard surface roads.

The first award of the Championship for Manufacturers was firmly won by Alpine-Renault, which had already gained fame competing for the earlier International Championship for Manufacturers. Fiat successfully placed second ahead of challenger Ford, but could not seriously challenge the winning Alpine. However, this would also prove to be the last award for the Alpine, as it gave way in subsequent years to Italian firms Lancia and Fiat. A French manufacturer would not regain the Championship again until Peugeot successfully captured the 1985 World Rally Championship for Manufacturers.

From 1973 to 1978, the WRC only awarded a season championship for the winning manufacturer. Scoring was given for the highest placing entry for each manufacturer. Thus if a particular manufacturer was to place 2nd, 4th, and 10th, they would receive points for 2nd place only. However, the manufacturer would still gain an advantage in scoring from its other entries, as the points for the 4th and 10th place entries would be denied to other manufacturers.



Calendar

For the first ever World Rally Championship, there were thirteen rallies.

Events

Championship

Manufacturers' championship 

 Positions in parentheses did not count to championship totals

See also 
 1973 in sports

External links

 FIA World Rally Championship 1973 at ewrc-results.com

World Rally Championship seasons
World Rally Championship Season, 1973